Fires in , the former name of Tokyo, during the Edo period (1600−1868) of Japan were so frequent that the city of Edo was characterized as the saying  goes.

Edo was something of a rarity in the world, as vast urban areas of the city were repeatedly leveled by fire.

Frequency of fires
In comparison, during the same period, great fires in Kyoto, Osaka and Kanazawa totaled only nine, six, and three, respectively, which made Edo's figure stand out from the other metropolises in Japan. According to other accounts, there were more than 85 major fires during the history of Edo.
Between 1600 and 1945, Edo/Tokyo was leveled every 25–50 years or so by fire, earthquakes, tsunami, volcanic eruptions, and war.

If smaller fires are also included, of the 1,798 fires that occurred in this 267 year-span, 269 were in 1601–1700, 541 in 1701–1800, and 986 in 1801–1867. As Edo's population in the late Tokugawa period increased in tandem with its growing economic prosperity, so too did the frequency of fires in the city increase proportionally to its growth. In particular, the 17 years between 1851 (Kaei 3) and 1867 saw 506 fires, to which unstable public order caused by the incapable administration of the Tokugawa shogunate was a major contributing factor.

List of great fires

The following representative table lists some great fires in the history of Edo that caused catastrophic losses of life and material damage. The Great Fire of Meireki in 1657 is considered to have been the most disastrous of the three conflagrations. Fires in Edo often quickly escalated, in large part due to the city's urban environment being characterized by inflammable wooden machiya buildings that were heated by charcoal-burning fireplaces. Given the limitations of firefighting technology at the time as well as the unreliability of Edo's water supply system, once a blaze in a neighborhood crammed with wooden building stock got out of hand there was little authorities could due to prevent its spread to other parts of the city. Apart from the great conflagrations, there were also intermittent small fires in this period that (taken together) caused greater damage and loss of life in Edo than any of the more singularly destructive blazes.

{| class="wikitable" style="text-align: center"
|+ Representative great fires in Edo
|-
! colspan="2" | Date
! colspan="2" | Name
! colspan="2" | Casualties
! colspan="4" | Damages
|-
! Gregorian
! Japanese (year/month/day)
! English
! Japanese
! Killed
! Missing
! Towns
! Samurai houses
! Temples & shrines
! Chōnin houses
|-
| December 26, 1601
| 6 Keicho/11ic/2
| colspan="2" | 
|
|
|
|
|
|
|-
| March 10or11, 1641
| 18 Kan-ei/1/29or30
| Oke-machi Fire
| 
| 400+
|
| 97
| 123
|
|
|-
| March 2–3, 1657
| 3 Meireki/1/18–19
| Great Fire of Meireki<ref>Titsingh, Isaac. (1834). Annales des empereurs du japon, p. 413.</ref>
| 
| Up to 107,000
|
|
|
|
|
|-
| January 25, 1683
| 2 Tenna/12/28
| Great Fire of TennaTitsingh, p. 415.
| 
| 830–3500
|
|
| 241
| 95
|
|-
| October 9, 1698
| 11 Genroku/9/6
| Chokugaku Fire
| 
| 3000
|
| 326
| 308
| 232
| 18,700
|-
| December 25, 1704
| 16 Genroku/11/29
| Mito-sama Fire
| 
|
|
|
| 275
| 75
| 20,000
|-
| March 14, 1745
| 2 Enkyo/2/12
| Rokudō Fire
| 
| 1323
|
|
| colspan="3" | 28,678
|-
| March 22, 1760
| 10 Horeki/2/6
| Hōreki Fire
| 
|
|
| 460
|
| 80
|
|-
| April 1, 1772
| 9 Meiwa/2/29
| Great Meiwa fireHall, John Whitney. (1955). Tanuma Okitsugu, 1719–1788: Forerunner of Modern Japan, p. 120.
| 
| 14,700
| 4060
| 904
|
|
|
|-
| April 22, 1806
| 3 Bunka/3/4
| Great Bunka fire
| 
| 1200
|
| 530
| 80
| 80
|
|-
| April 24, 1829
| 12 Bunsei/3/21
| Great Fire of Bunsei
| 
| 2800
|
|
| colspan="3" | 370,000
|-
| March 16, 1834
| 5 Tempo/2/7
| Kōgo Fire
| 
| 4000
|
|
|
|
|
|-
| March 2, 1845
| 2 Koka/1/24
| Aoyama Fire
| 
| 800–900
|
| 126
| 400
| 5000
|
|-
| November 11, 1855
| 2 Ansei/10/2
| Earthquake Fire
| 
| 4500–26,000
|
|
|
|
|
|}

 Footnotes 

Others
 1668 : A major fire broke out in Edo on March 3, 1668 (Kanbun 8, 1st day of the 2nd month).  This disaster was attributed to arson; and the fire burned for 45 days.
 1682 A significant fire burned controllably in the city on February 5, 1682 (Tenna 1, 28th day of the 12th month).
 1697 (Genroku 10): This was called the fire of the tenth year of Genroku.

Causes of fires
During the Edo period, fire was an indispensable element of daily life. It was used for cooking and lighting, which in turn gave rise to accidents. Arson, due to various motives, was another source of fires. The greater frequency of great fires in Edo compared to other cities came from various reasons, which included a dense urban layout housing a large population, existence of an impoverished social class, and Edo's unique meteorological conditions.

Matsunosuke Nishiyama, a scholar who studied Edo's fires, summarized the causes of the fires as:
 "It is not unthinkable that in Edo, probably many residents simply rejoiced in the great fires";
 "The lack of a unified political system in a metropolis like Edo was one of the causes of the frequent great fires";
 "Edo's , considering the fires inevitable and their spreading unstoppable, would remain content as long as their own houses did not become origins of fires".

Growth of population

After  established the shogunate in Edo, daimyōs (vassal lords) and hatamoto (senior retainers) residences were built around Edo Castle and housed a large number of samurai. Merchants and artisans who supported the life of the samurai soon migrated to Edo in flocks and resulted in a population boom. The population of Edo grew from roughly 400,000 in 1640 (Kan'ei 17) to around 800,000 in 1693 (Genroku 6), and grew to about 1,100,000 by 1721 (Kyōhō 6). In contrast to the vast residential areas of the samurai, chōnin were confined to much smaller areas. The growing population pushed their population density to an extremely high degree. Their residences were densely arranged in compact areas, and shabby  were common.  The per capita living space, kitchen and closet included, was usually the size of six tatami mats. On top of that, the wood and paper construction materials easily became fuel for a fire. All these conditions naturally led to a high possibility of fire accidents.

Arson

As a major cause of fires in Edo, burglars  were recorded in great numbers. Many of the arrested arsonists were living an impoverished life due to the high cost of living of Edo and ineligibility to work as indentured servants for not having a guarantor. Some of them had had their houses burned down and had little to lose from committing crimes. Most of them came from the lower social classes.

Motivations for arson varied, though the most prominent one was looting. Arsonists of this kind would set fire on windy days and take advantage of the ensuing disturbances to commit theft. Other than looting, frequent motives were those arising from social relationships, such as servants seeking vengeance upon their masters and grudges due to failed romantic relations. Also recorded were instances of merchants setting fire to competitors' businesses and children playing with fire, and even a case with a confession of "suddenly felt like setting fire". Since a fire would also mean business for carpenters, plasterworkers and steeplejacks in the subsequent reconstruction, some of them would delight at the occurrence and aggravation of fires. In particular, as many firefighters primarily worked as steeplejacks, some of them would intentionally spread fire for the sake of showing off firefighting skills in public or creating business opportunities for themselves. This prompted the shogunate to issue warning ordinances and execute some offending firefighters. Arrested arsonists were paraded through the streets before they were burned to death. However, in spite of the intolerant policy of the shogunate towards arson, arson-induced fires were never fully eliminated from Edo. During the bakumatsu period, public order deteriorated as administration of the shogunate grew incompetent. As a consequence, fires from arson increased drastically.

 Some arsonists became subjects of literature and kabuki works. These included , whom the Great Fire of Tenna of 1683 (Tenna 3), in which up to 3,500 people perished, was also named after. Oshichi was not responsible for the fire, but lost her house to it. She took shelter in a temple and fell in love with a page there. A year later, she attempted arson based on the fantasy that another fire would enable the two to meet again. She was arrested, tried, and executed by fire. Her story was the basis of Ihara Saikaku's  and Tsuruya Nanboku IV's .

Meteorological conditions
The strong winter monsoon from the north was a meteorological condition unique to Edo. It contributed to many winter and spring fires that occurred in dry weather brought about by prevailing northwest and north winds. In addition, strong south winds in the spring and autumn were another cause of great fires. For this reason, the four teams of  established by the shogunate in 1658 (Manji 1) were stationed to the northwest of the Edo Castle to protect the castle from fires spreading from that direction.

When the fires were counted by the month, March saw the most "great fires", followed by February, April and January. These four months accounted for 70% of all great fires. The Great Fire of Meireki, being the most catastrophic fire in the history of Edo for claiming up to 107,000 lives, occurred on March 2, 1657 (the 18th day of the first month of Meireki 3 in the Japanese lunisolar Tenpō calendar). Edo's chōnin were well aware of this fact. In winter, women were asked to leave for their parents' residences in the suburbs of Edo and return only after the fire season had passed, resulting in a seasonal population fluctuation. In 1725 (Kyōhō 10), the population in the sixth month was more than 10,000 larger than in the fourth month. Over 90% of the added population were females.

Tokugawa shogunate's fire prevention measures

Early in the Edo period, prominent officials in the shogunate established the protection of the shōgun and Edo Castle as a priority on windy days, when arson was most likely to occur. In contrast, as a remnant of the Sengoku period, fire prevention measures concerning chōnins residential areas were given almost no attention. However, as chōnin gained social power, the shogunate's policies also evolved, as a symbol of which, the eighth shogun, expanded the fire prevention measures to cover Edo universally as part of the Kyōhō Reforms.

Firefighting organizations
In the early Edo period, firefighting was not institutionalized. However, repetition of great fires became a turning point for the establishment of the  system. The hikeshis primary method of firefighting was to demolish buildings surrounding those already ablaze to prevent fire from spreading. During the Meiwa era, a type of wooden pump operated by manpower called  was used, but it never became a fully viable means of firefighting due to the lack of uninterrupted water supply. Up until the Meiji Restoration, the manual demolition of buildings by professional firefighters, of which steeplejacks were a majority, remained the primary method of firefighting.

Daimyō hikeshi
The daimyō hikeshi was institutionalized in 1643 (Kan'ei 20), two years after the Fire of Oke-machi, as the form of mandatory regular firefighting service assigned to the daimyōs. Before this, daimyōs were dispatched to firefighting tasks by extemporaneous orders issued after fires had broken out.

Jōbikeshi

The jōbikeshi was institutionalized in 1658 (Manji 1), one year after the Great Fire of Meireki. Hatamotos were assigned responsibilities of firefighting directly under the command of the shogunate. They were stationed in houses equipped with fire lookout towers called . They also employed professional firefighters called . Four teams were initially organized. Later, their numbers fluctuated, with as many as 15 teams, to just one team towards the end of the Edo period, depending on the shogunate's financial and military statuses as well as the readiness of the machibikeshi.

Machibikeshi

While daimyō hikeshi and jōbikeshi were experienced firefighters, they were never really concerned about fires occurring in chōnins residential areas; in the meantime, tanabikeshi was nothing more than bands of amateurish firefighters who themselves would flee from intimidating fires.

In 1720 (Kyōhō 5), Tokugawa Yoshimune institutionalized machibikeshi as part of the Kyōhō Reforms. He ordered   to establish new firefighting units that would be truly capable of protecting chōnins residential areas. Under the machibikeshi system, each town was required to dispatch its chōnin to firefighting tasks. Ōoka accepted suggestions from town officials and organized towns' firefighting groups. Forty-eight groups were formed to the west of the Sumida River. Sixteen other groups were formed in Honjo and Fukugawa to the east of the river. Each group had its own unique  and uniform. Rapport was usual within each group, but discord between groups was common as well. In 1730 (Kyōhō 15), these firefighting groups were reorganized into larger groups to increase the scale and efficiency of fire-time mobilization.

Although machibikeshi were initially only responsible for chōnins residential areas, their capabilities became recognized and were later dispatched to fight fires in locations within the samurais' residential areas, such as bridges, shrines, rice granaries, and even inside Edo Castle. By the time of the Meiji Restoration, they had become the main firefighting force of Edo, while in contrast, buke hikeshi were greatly reduced by that time.

Anti-arson measures
As arson was a major cause of fires in Edo, the shogunate spent considerable effort in cracking down on arsonists. A new government position, was introduced. Chōnin were given rewards for capturing arsonists. Arson was made a felony  and punished with burning at the stake as a warning to the public.

Hitsuke tōzoku aratameHitsuke tōzoku aratame was a position introduced by the shogunate to target the felonies of arson, theft, and gambling. Although initially there were three separate posts for the three crimes, they were known to be held concurrently by military official  in 1683 (Tenna 3). Later they were eliminated for a short time, but were re-introduced in 1703 (Genroku 16) and unified into a single position in 1718 (Kyōhō 3).

Contrary to the machi-bugyō, who were civil officials, hitsuke tōzoku aratame were military officials. Therefore, their interrogation strategies tended to be violent. While they had the power to arrest suspected arsonists, there was no penalty for mistaken arrests. For this reason, they often tortured the arrested suspects to force confessions, leading to a great number of false charges.

Rewards for capturing arsonists and execution by burning
The shogunate repeatedly issued ordinances that demanded captured arsonists be immediately turned in and offered rewards to their captors. Furthermore, outstanding crimes against someone who captured an arsonist would be pardoned. Even arsonists who played a significant role in informing against their accomplices or other arsonists were eligible for rewards on top of amnesty. In 1723 (Kyōhō 8), it was ordered that any person could be arrested on the grounds of suspicious behavior in the case of a fire even if he did not commit arson.

As a warning to the public, arrested arsonists were paraded through the city and burned at the stake. Furthermore, charges against them were written on wooden plaques and put on public display. Family members of arsonists were also implicated, and the wives and daughters reduced to indentured servitude or sent into exile.

In the case of a contract arson, the person who paid for the crime was also punishable. When the arsonist was a samurai, execution by burning was inapplicable. Whoever threatened arson with written notes were initially capitally punishable, but the punishment was later reduced to exile.

Although punishments were given based on the principles described above, extenuating circumstances such as unsuccessful arson attempts were also considered. Arsonists under 15 would not be executed but sent to exile or put on probation.

Urban planning
Dense distribution of buildings built from flammable materials was an important factor that allowed fires to evolve from small to great. Once one building caught fire, the neighboring ones would soon ignite before any firefighters could respond. For this reason, in the aftermath of the Great Fire of Meireki, structures made with non-flammable materials were promoted in Edo to enhance the city's defense against fires. Adoption of fire-resistant materials including tiled roofs and earthen houses became mandatory.

Hiyokechi and hirokōji

After the catastrophic loss in the Great Fire of Meireki, fire prevention measures received a great amount of emphasis in the reconstruction plan of Edo. Fire barrier zones were set up to prevent fires from spreading. That started with moving the primary residences of the  outside of the Edo Castle and dedicating the vacated space to fire prevention. Relocation of residences belonging to other daimyōs and hatamotos followed. To alleviate the dense compaction of buildings inside Edo, most of the destinations were chosen to be distant from the castle. Furthermore, during the Genroku era, daimyōs were granted land for constructing their secondary and tertiary residences in the outskirts of Edo, and their tertiary residences were also used as shelters during fires. Land was reclaimed as another means of accommodating new samurai residences. Around 1661 (Kanbun 1), land reclamation in Honjo was completed to allow for construction of samurai residences as well as relocation of chōnin residences. Similar relocation orders were also issued to temples and shrines. Most of them moved outside Edo's canals while some of them found their new sites in Asakusa, Komagome and Koishikawa.

Additionally, to accompany the street widening policy, houses were required to remove any eaves. The relocations resulted in an enlarged urban Edo. In 1662 (Kanbun 2), the areas of Ueno, Asakusa and Shiba outside the canals were brought under the administration of the machi-bugyō.

After the Great Fire of Tenna, another wave of relocation involving daimyō residences, temples, and shrines, and allowed for new hiyokechi and extended hirokōji. Most temples and shrines were now located outside of the canals as a result. During the Kyōho Reforms, fire prevention was further strengthened starting with the institutionalization of the machibikeshi. In the light of Tokugawa Yoshimune's enthusiasm for a non-flammable Edo, new hiyokechi were set up in Kanda, Hatchōbori and Ichigaya.

Despite the effort to establish fire barrier zones around Edo, there were also cases where homes were built inside the hiyokechi, and stores along the hirokōji, which significantly reduced their efficacy, sometimes to the point where there was an even higher fire risk than before.

Fire-resistant and fireproof structures

After the great fire of 1601 (Keichō 6), the shogunate mandated that thatched roofs be modified into shingle roofs. Later, tiled roofs became fashionable among buildings inside luxurious daimyō residences and were also adopted in some chōnin residences. However, after the Great Fire of Meireki, a policy change banned the use of tiled roofs because the fire-resistant tiles fell from roofs and caused many injuries. Instead, flammable thatched roofs were required to be covered with earth to prevent fire from spreading. In 1661 (Kanbun 1), the use of thatched roofs in new buildings was also banned, making shingle roofs the only permitted choice.

It was not until Tokugawa Yoshimune assumed power that tiled roofs became mandatory. For samurai residences, in 1723 (Kyōhō 8), burned-down hatamoto residences near Banchō were required to be rebuilt with tiled roofs. Interest-free loans were also provided for this purpose. After around 1725 (Kyōhō 10), in limited areas, existing residences were required to adopt tiled roofs. Later, this policy became enforced in larger areas with the warning that non-compliant residences would be demolished. For chōnin residences, the ban on tiled roofs was overturned in 1720 (Kyōhō 5).  After 1722 (Kyōhō 7), all buildings in Edo were required to have tiled roofs and be built from or covered with earth, although out of consideration of the economic burden on the chōnin, roofs made from oyster shells were also permitted in some cases. Similar to samurai residences, exemption of public service fees and interest-free loans were available, and unmodified residences were subject to demolition.

The non-flammable Edo program driven by the shogunate was carried out under the rule of Tokugawa Yoshimune, though after his death in 1751 (Kan'ei 4), the shogunate became less active due to its troubled financial status. The program was never fully completed, which became the main cause of various great fires before the Meiji era.

Prohibitions and fire alert orders
In order to prevent fires, the shogunate issued all kinds of directives including prohibitions of potential causes of fires, fire alert orders during important events, and bans on specific activities during actual fires.

Prohibitions targeting fire hazards were directed against public bathhouses, fireworks, and waste burning. Most chōnin residences were not built with a bath to avoid being suspected as the cause in the case of a fire. As a result, public bathhouses were popular. Although the necessity of fire in the bathhouse business prevented a complete ban, in 1653 (Jōō 2) fire was prohibited in public bathhouses until after 6 pm. The public bathhouses were further required to keep the bath water until morning so that the water could be used for firefighting. Production of fireworks inside the city was prohibited in 1648 (Keian 1). Their use was also banned except at the estuaries and further restricted to only along the Sumida River in 1642 (Keian 5). Sagichō celebrations in towns and houses were banned in the Genroku era. Still earlier, waste burning was outlawed in 1655 (Meireki 1).

Under these ordinances, the city was patrolled to prevent fires and quarrels, water-filled buckets were prepared, and the city area was cleaned up.

Chōnins fire prevention measures
While the saying  unequivocally displays the unrestrained attitude of Edo's people towards life, it also reflects their pragmatic mentality concerning the city's frequent great fires—money was better off spent soon than lost to a fire. For Edo's chōnin, fires had become a daily routine, yet their spreading was almost unstoppable. When a fires struck their residences and businesses, the first and foremost goal was to evacuate quickly and preserve their properties. On the other hand, they also paid scrupulous attention to making sure that fires would not break out from their own residences.

Provisions against fires
Fires occurred in Edo regardless of day or night. If a fire broke out while one was asleep, changing clothes and preparing lighting could spell delay in evacuation. Hence, when it entered the fire season as winter approached, as a precaution, people would place items including clothes,  and  next to their pillows in case of emergency. When alerted of a fire, the origin and the wind direction would first be confirmed. When the hazard became imminent, they would evacuate with only the valuables that could be taken along.

To protect the valuables from fire,  were used. Yōjinkago were a type of large bamboo basket with which one could carry on the back or shoulders. For important documents, wicker boxes called  were used. Although daihachiguruma and kurumanagamochi could transport larger numbers of items, their large sizes tended to make them obstacles during evacuation. There were also instances where the transported items caught fire from flying sparks and helped spread the fire. These reasons led to their ban by the shogunate.

As an additional measure, and as a forerunner to fire insurance, rich merchants would prepay wood retailers for the materials needed for building a house. If their businesses burned down, then after the debris was removed, the prepaid materials could be immediately claimed for reconstruction, so that the business could resume within a short time.

Dozō and anaguraDozō and anagura were structures used for storing items that could not be transferred during fires. Rich merchants typically owned multiples of them. Due to their high costs, dozō were mostly built and used by merchants; in comparison, anagura were more affordable for the common people.Dozō were storehouses with thick plastered earthen walls and had tiled roofs in most cases. Fire resistance enabled by their thick walls made them ideal for storing commodities, household belongings, tools, and valuable articles. However, they could also suffer from vulnerabilities caused by substandard construction and inappropriate maintenance, letting in fires from crevices in windows and entrances as well as mouse holes, and even collapsing as a result. For this reason, rich merchants would prepare earth in a ready condition so that they could have their regular plasterers quickly seal up their dozō when fires occurred. There were also cases where, when they themselves were originators of fires, they would leave the doors of their dozō open and let them burn down as a form of public atonement. Specially fortified dozō for storing documents called  existed but never gained popularity due to their even higher construction cost, even though they were strong enough to survive great fires. On the other hand, there were also residences and businesses called  that were built to resemble storehouses. However, their fire resistance had to be more or less compromised to accommodate the necessary wide openings for business use. Misegura that have survived to the modern day are now mostly found in the cities of Katori (Sawara area), Tochigi and Kawagoe, giving these cities and their neighborhoods the name .Anagura were underground storage spaces. Unlike the small under-bed storage units, anagura had sufficient space to contain a person and were also built to store valuables. They were cheaper than the dozō, yet remained effective against fires and theft for they had only the covers to secure. Anagura in Edo were first used in 1656 (Meireki 2) by a drapery vendor running a store named  in Nihonbashi. The effectiveness of Izumi-yas anagura were recognized in the Great Fire of Meireki and helped popularize them. Concerning the popularity of anagura in Edo, Kawagoe salt merchant  wrote in his memoir  that one tenth of Edo had become holes. Although anagura in Edo were mainly built with cypress to prevent leaks caused by high groundwater levels, the underground humidity had nevertheless limited their durability.

Punishments for fire accidents
Although the shogunate imposed punishments including death by burning to crack down on arson, its punishments for fire accidents were nowhere near as harsh. Those of the samurai class who caused a fire would be acquitted if they managed to extinguish it within their residences; so it was with the chōnin if the fire remained small. Although the council of  considered proposals to impose harsh penalties including death and exile in the case of great fires, such proposals were never adopted. Anecdotal reasoning held that fire accidents at the time could befall anyone, and that the rōjū questioned their readiness to commit seppuku should they themselves accidentally start a great fire.

Samurais' fire accidents
If a fire occurred in a daimyō residence, as long as the gate was preserved, the owner would not be held accountable even if the houses caught fire. Naturally, the gate became the focus of protection. Some samurai would take their sliding doors off the frames and carry them along as they escaped. Some others would shut the machibikeshi who rushed to the scene out, fight the fires on their own power, then claim that the smoke was merely coming from bonfires. Three fire accidents would force a samurai to move his residence to the outskirts of Edo even though this was not explicitly stipulated.

Chōnins', temples', and shrines' fire accidents
The penalty could be prolonged to 50 days and aggravated with hand cuffing if the fire occurred on a day when the shogun set out for a visit. Members of the  where he belonged would be punished with 20 days of oshikome as well. Furthermore, the gachigyōji of the six towns surrounding the fire source except in the leeward would also receive 20 days of oshikome.

Even a fire that coincided with the shogun's visit or turned great would only add another three days to the punishment. Fire accidents were also punished with much greater clemency in towns built around influential temples and shrines than in other towns. A fire burning down areas wider than  would incur only three days of oshikome.

Economic impact
Every time a great fire struck, the material and monetary expenses necessitated for resurrecting a devastated Edo were tremendous. Hence, the influence of a great fire on consumer prices as well as economic prospects could ripple from Edo and affect the entire Japan. The frequent occurrence of great fires can therefore be said as a major driving factor that supported the economic growth of Edo. On the contrary, the reconstruction cost also became an enormous burden for the shogunate and contributed to its troubled financial conditions. Also suffering from the economic pressure were the chōnin. It is not unimaginable that a merchant running a big business could be reduced to living in a nagaya after a great fire. When it came to the shogunate's budget, among expenditures allocated to the chōnin, those related to fire prevention and firefighting also accounted for the largest proportions.

Skyrocketing consumer prices
Each great fire meant a price surge in Edo. Foods, starting with rice, as well as construction materials required for rebuilding houses all saw their prices multiply. The inflated workload of reconstruction in the city helped send the cost of hired artisans soaring. Besides artisans, indentured servants also enjoyed an increase in their salaries for fewer of them wishing to work in Edo out of fear of great fires. Other than these, rents rose based on the shortage of housing; so did the ferry fares due to increased demand before bridges were re-built. These were all impacts that Edo's great fires exerted on the local consumer prices.

In order to control inflationary prices, the shogunate issued ordinances that outlawed price hikes, imposed upper limits on artisans' pay, and penalized the most prominent offenders. Measures that addressed the shortage of rice in Edo were put into effect. Rice was purchased directly from farmers and resold. Farmers were also permitted to come to Edo to sell rice themselves.

Due to increased number of purchase orders placed from Edo to places across the country, the influence of Edo's great fires on the economic prospects was nationwide. The shogunate similarly issued warnings to wide areas against opportunistic price hikes. Nevertheless, that did not stop merchants like , who built up a fortune from wood trading and contracted construction after the Great Fire of Meireki.

Financial burden on the shogunate
Expenses of rebuilding the burned-down facilities occupied a large portion of the shogunate's budget. For comparison, the shogun at the time and great-grandson of Tokugawa Ieyasu, inherited money and properties worth 4.23 million ryō from his ancestors.

Other than reconstruction, disaster relief activities were another source of large expenditures. After the Great Fire of Meireki, hatamotos and  received endowments proportional to their stipends and were allowed advanced rice payments. For daimyōs, apart from endowments, were also given ten-year loans. About 160,000 ryō were spent on endowments for chōnin, whose shares corresponded to the sizes of the facades of their residences. Furthermore, daimyōs were ordered to provide congee to chōnin who had lost their homes; chōnin who had their rice granaries burned down were supplied with free rice. After the Great Fire of Meireki, the shogunate continued its relief efforts whenever a great fire occurred, albeit on smaller scales owing to a deteriorating financial status.

See also
 List of Kyoto's fires
 List of historic fires

Notes

References

Sources

 
 
 
 
 
 
 
 
 
 
 
 
 
 
 Hall, John Whitney. (1955). Tanuma Okitsugu, 1719–1788: Forerunner of Modern Japan. Cambridge: Harvard University Press.  OCLC  445621
  Iwao, Seiichi, Teizō Iyanaga et Susumu Ishii. (2002). Dictionnaire historique du Japon. Paris: Maisonneuve & Larose. ; 
 Screech, Timon. (2006).  Secret Memoirs of the Shoguns: Isaac Titsingh and Japan, 1779–1822. London: RoutledgeCurzon.  (cloth);  (cloth);  (electronic)
  Titsingh, Isaac. (1834). Annales des empereurs du Japon.  Paris: Oriental Translation Fund of Great Britain and Ireland. ; see also  Imprimerie Royale de France,''

External links
 Various drawings related to fires in Edo 

Edo
Urban fires in Asia
Edo
Fires, Edo
Edo